In mathematics, a Misiurewicz point is a parameter value in the Mandelbrot set (the parameter space of complex quadratic maps) and also in real quadratic maps of the interval  for which the critical point is strictly preperiodic (i.e., it becomes periodic after finitely many iterations but is not periodic itself). By analogy, the term Misiurewicz point is also used for parameters in a multibrot set where the unique critical point is strictly preperiodic. (This term makes less sense for maps in greater generality that have more than one (free) critical point because some critical points might be periodic and others not). These points are named after mathematician Michał Misiurewicz who first studied them.

Mathematical notation 
A parameter  is a Misiurewicz point  if it satisfies the equations

and 

so :

where :

Name
Misiurewicz points are named after the Polish-American mathematician Michał Misiurewicz.

The term "Misiurewicz point" is used ambiguously: Misiurewicz originally investigated maps in which all critical points were non-recurrent (that is, there is a neighborhood of every critical point that is not visited by the orbit of this critical point), and this meaning is firmly established in the context of dynamics of iterated interval maps. The case that for a quadratic polynomial the unique critical point is strictly preperiodic is only a very special case. In this restricted sense, the term is used in complex dynamics; a more appropriate one would be Misiurewicz–Thurston points (after William Thurston, who investigated postcritically finite rational maps).

Quadratic maps
A complex quadratic polynomial has only  one critical point. The Misiurewicz points of this family of maps are roots of the equations

(subject to the condition that the critical point is not periodic), 
where :
k is the pre-period
n is the period

For example, the Misiurewicz points with k=2 and n=1, denoted by M2,1, are roots of

The root c=0 is not a Misiurewicz point because the critical point is a fixed point when c=0, and so is periodic rather than pre-periodic. This leaves a single Misiurewicz point M2,1 at c = −2.

Properties of Misiurewicz points of  complex quadratic mapping
Misiurewicz points belong to the boundary of the Mandelbrot set. Misiurewicz points are dense in the boundary of the Mandelbrot set.

If  is a Misiurewicz point, then the associated filled Julia set is equal to the Julia set, and means the filled Julia set has no interior.

If  is a Misiurewicz point, then in the corresponding Julia set all periodic cycles are repelling (in particular the cycle that the critical orbit falls onto).

The Mandelbrot set and Julia set  are locally asymptotically self-similar around Misiurewicz points.

Types

Criteria for classifications:
 the number of external rays that land on them
 visual types

Misiurewicz points can be classified according to the number of external rays that land on them  
 with 3 or more external arguments (or angles), branch points, which disconnect the Mandelbrot set,
 with exactly 2 external arguments (points of arcs within the Mandelbrot set) that are less conspicuous and not easily found in pictures; non-branch points 
 with 1 external argument: branch tips = end points 

Visual types
 branch tips
 centers of spirals
 points where branches meet

According to the Branch Theorem of the Mandelbrot set, all branch points of the Mandelbrot set are Misiurewicz points.

Most Misiurewicz parameters in the Mandelbrot set look like "centers of spirals". The explanation for this is that at a Misiurewicz parameter, the critical value jumps onto a repelling periodic cycle after finitely many iterations. At each point during the cycle, the Julia set is asymptotically self-similar by a complex multiplication by the derivative of this cycle. If the derivative is non-real, this implies that the Julia set near the periodic cycle has a spiral structure. Thus, a similar spiral structure occurs in the Julia set near the critical value and, by Tan Lei's theorem, also in the Mandelbrot set near any Misiurewicz parameter for which the repelling orbit has a non-real multiplier. Depending on the value of this multiplier, the spiral shape can seem either more or less pronounced. The number of arms at the spiral equals the number of branches at the Misiurewicz parameter, and this equals the number of branches at the critical value in the Julia set. Even the principal Misiurewicz point in the 1/3-limb, at the end of the parameter rays at angles 9/56, 11/56, and 15/56, turns out to be asymptotically a spiral, with infinitely many turns, even though this is hard to see without magnification.

External arguments
External arguments of Misiurewicz points,  measured in turns are:
rational numbers
proper fraction with even denominator
dyadic fractions with denominator  and finite (terminating) expansion: 
fraction with denominator  and repeating expansion: 

Examples of Misiurewicz points of  complex quadratic mapping

End points

Point :
 is a tip of the filament
 landing point of the external ray for the angle = 1/6
 Its critical orbits is   

Point   
 is the end-point of main antenna of Mandelbrot set
 is  landing point of only one external ray (parameter ray) of angle 1/2 
 Its critical orbit:   
 is   	
 Symbolic sequence = C L R R R ...
 preperiod is 2 and period 1

Branch points

Point  
 is a principal Misiurewicz point of the 1/3 limb
 it has 3 external rays:  9/56, 11/56 and 15/56.

Other points
These are points which are not-branch and not-end ponts.  

Point  is near a Misiurewicz point . It is 
 a center of a two-arms spiral
 a landing point of 2 external rays with angles:  and  where denominator is 
 preperiodic point with preperiod  and period 

Point  is near a Misiurewicz point , 
 which is landing point for pair of rays: , 
 has preperiod  and period

See also
 Arithmetic dynamics
 Feigenbaum point
 Dendrite (mathematics)

References

Further reading 

Michał Misiurewicz (1981), "Absolutely continuous measures for certain maps of an interval". Publications Mathématiques de l'IHÉS, 53 (1981), p. 17-51

External links

Preperiodic (Misiurewicz) points in the Mandelbrot set by Evgeny Demidov
M & J-sets similarity for preperiodic points. Lei's theorem  by Douglas C. Ravenel
Misiurewicz Point of the logistic map by J. C. Sprott

Fractals
Systems theory
Dynamical systems